Jan "Lillen" Svensson (born 27 April 1944) is a Swedish former footballer who played as a midfielder, best known for representing Hammarby IF and Djurgårdens IF in Allsvenskan.

Club career

Saltö BK
Born in Karlskrona, Svensson started his career with local club Saltö BK. In 1966, Saltö was relegated from Division 3, Sweden's third tier, due to being deducted 14 points by the Swedish FA after Svensson had been incorrectly registered during the season.

Djurgårdens IF
In 1967, Svensson moved to Djurgårdens IF in Allsvenskan. Known as a hard-working central midfielder, he made 89 appearances for the club and scored eleven goals.

IS Halmia
Between 1972 and 1974, Svensson played for IS Halmia. He was later voted as one of the best eleven players to ever had represented the club.

Hammarby IF
In 1974, Svensson returned to Stockholm but moved to Hammarby IF, one of Djurgården's biggest rivals. He started to work as a groundskeeper at Zinkensdamms IP, where Hammarby's bandy section played their home games.

Svensson went on to play six full seasons with Hammarby in Allsvenskan, playing a total of 117 games but failing to score a single competitive goal. He retired from football at the end of 1979, aged 34.

References

External links

1944 births
Living people
Swedish footballers
Allsvenskan players
Djurgårdens IF Fotboll players
Hammarby Fotboll players
IS Halmia players
Association football midfielders
People from Karlskrona
Sportspeople from Blekinge County